Dick van den Polder (23 September 1934 – 21 October 2013) was a Dutch footballer and journalist.

Career

Football career
Van den Polder played for Excelsior between 1954 and 1964. He was one of the club's first professionals, and made a total of 199 appearances for them.

Journalism career
Van den Polder retired from football at the age of 29 to become a journalist, and wrote for a number of papers including Rotterdamse Parool, Vrije Volk, Rotterdams Dagblad and Radio Rijnmond.

References

1934 births
2013 deaths
Dutch footballers
Excelsior Rotterdam players
Association football midfielders
Dutch journalists
Footballers from Rotterdam